Trimethoxyamphetamines (TMAs) are a family of isomeric psychedelic hallucinogenic drugs. There exist six different TMAs that differ only in the position of the three methoxy groups: TMA, TMA-2, TMA-3, TMA-4, TMA-5, and TMA-6. The TMAs are analogs of the phenethylamine cactus alkaloid mescaline. The TMAs are substituted amphetamines, however, their mechanism of action is more complex than that of the unsubstituted compound amphetamine, probably involving agonist activity on serotonin receptors such as the 5HT2A receptor in addition to the generalised dopamine receptor agonism typical of most amphetamines.  This action on serotonergic receptors likely underlie the psychedelic effects of these compounds. It is reported that some TMAs elicit a range of emotions ranging from sadness to empathy and euphoria. TMA was first synthesized by Hey, in 1947. Synthesis data as well as human activity data has been published in the book PiHKAL.

The most important TMA compound from a pharmacological standpoint is TMA-2, as this isomer has been much more widely used as a recreational drug and sold on the grey market as a so-called research chemical; TMA (sometimes referred to as "mescalamphetamine" or TMA-1) and TMA-6 have also been used in this way to a lesser extent. These three isomers are significantly more active as hallucinogenic drugs, and have consequently been placed onto the illegal drug schedules in some countries such as the Netherlands and Japan. The other three isomers TMA-3, TMA-4, and TMA-5 are not known to have been used as recreational drugs to any great extent.

TMAs 

Note: Because they are isomers, the TMAs have the same chemical formula, C12H19NO3, and the same molecular mass, 225.28 g/mol.

Properties

Legality

Sweden
Sveriges riksdag added TMA-2 to schedule I ("substances, plant materials and fungi which normally do not have medical use") as narcotics in Sweden as of Dec 30, 1999, published by Medical Products Agency in their regulation LVFS 2004:3 listed as 2,4,5-trimetoxiamfetamin (TMA-2).

United Kingdom
Illegal under the Psychoactive Substances Act 2016

United States of America
3,4,5-Trimethoxyamphetamine is listed as a Schedule 1 controlled substance, along with positional isomers 2,4,5-Trimethoxyamphetamine (TMA-5), 2,4,6-Trimethoxyamphetamine (TMA-6) and Escaline.

See also 
 Mescaline
 Hallucinogenic drug
 Amphetamine

References

External links 
 PiHKAL entries:
 TMA
 TMA in PiHKAL • info
 TMA-2
 TMA-2 in PiHKAL • info
 TMA-3
 TMA-3 in PiHKAL • info
 TMA-4
 TMA-4 in PiHKAL • info
 TMA-5
 TMA-5 in PiHKAL • info
 TMA-6
 TMA-6 in PiHKAL • info
 Erowid TMA vault
 EMCDDA Report on the risk assessment of TMA-2 in the framework of the joint action on new synthetic drugs

Substituted amphetamines
Designer drugs
Phenol ethers
Psychedelic drugs